Dryomyza simplex is a fly from the family Dryomyzidae.

Distribution
Found in the Nearctic realm of the United States and Canada.

References

Dryomyzidae
Diptera of North America
Insects described in 1862
Taxa named by Hermann Loew